Naroda railway station is a railway station on Ahmedabad–Udaipur Line under the Ahmedabad railway division of Western Railway zone. This is situated at GIDC, Naroda in Ahmedabad of the Indian state of Gujarat.

Trains

List of trains that take halt here:
 19703/04 Asarva–Udaipur City Intercity Express
 79401/02 Asarva–Himmatnagar DEMU
 79403/04 Asarva–Himmatnagar DEMU

References

Ahmedabad railway division
Railway stations in Ahmedabad district